The Coppin State Eagles baseball team is the varsity intercollegiate athletic team of the Coppin State University in Baltimore, Maryland, United States. The team competes in the National Collegiate Athletic Association's Division I and is a member of the Northeast Conference (NEC). Through the 2022 season, the Eagles had competed in the school's full-time home of the Mid-Eastern Athletic Conference (MEAC), but after that season, the MEAC merged its baseball league into that of the NEC. Coppin State and the three other MEAC members that sponsored baseball became NEC associate members in that sport.

Head coaches

References

External links